Michael Neville may refer to:
Mike Neville (ice hockey), Canadian professional ice hockey player
Mike Neville (newsreader) (1936–2017), British television presenter

See also
Mick Neville (disambiguation)